Naman may refer to:

 Naman language, a language of Vanuatu
 Naman, Iran (disambiguation), several villages in Iran
 Naman, New South Wales, a locality in Australia

People with the name 
 Naman Ahuja (born 1974),Indian art historian and curator
 Naman Keïta (born 1978), French athlete
 Naman Ojha (born 1983), Indian cricketer
 Naman Ramachandran, Indian critic and journalist
 Naman Shaw (born 1982), Indian television actor
 Naman Tanwar (born 1998), Indian boxer

See also
 Naaman (disambiguation)